Mitromorpha exigua is a species of sea snail, a marine gastropod mollusk in the family Mitromorphidae.

Description

Distribution

References

External links
 Entry at Nhm London

exigua
Gastropods described in 1884